Ela Veresiu is a Canadian-Romanian consumer sociologist and an associate professor of marketing at the Schulich School of Business, York University.

Biography 
Veresiu was born in Bucharest, Romania. She emigrated to Toronto, Canada, with her parents in 1995. In 2015, she completed her PhD degree in marketing, summa cum laude, at Witten/Herdecke University in Germany.

Her research focuses on understanding and promoting consumer diversity and market inclusion at the interplay of identity, technology, branding, and institutions. In 2019, her research was awarded the Ferber Award Honorable Mention for the best dissertation-based article published in the most recent volume of the Journal of Consumer Research. In 2019, her research was also awarded the prestigious Sidney J. Levy Award for outstanding dissertation-based, qualitative methodology marketing article published in a top-tier academic journal. Her work is funded by the Social Sciences and Humanities Research Council of Canada (SSHRC) Insight Development Grant. In 2016, she was named “one of Canada’s marketing leaders under 30” and “one of the youngest business professors in North America.”

Selected publications 

 "Creating the Responsible Consumer: Moralistic Governance Regimes and Consumer Subjectivity" with Markus Giesler, Journal of Consumer Research, 41, October 2014, pp. 849–867.
 "Introducing a Spatial Perspective to analyze market dynamics" with Rodrigo B. Castilhos and Pierre-Yann Dolbec, Marketing Theory, 17, March 2017, pp. 9–29. 
 "Neoliberalism and Consumption" with Markus Giesler, Consumer Culture Theory, eds. Eric J. Arnould and Craig J. Thompson, SAGE Publishing, August 2018, pp. 255–275. 
 "The Consumer Acculturative Effect of State-Subsidized Spaces: Spatial Segregation, Cultural Integration, and Consumer Contestation" Consumption, Markets & Culture, October 2018.
 "Beyond Acculturation: Multiculturalism and the Institutional Shaping of an Ethnic Consumer Subject" with Markus Giesler, Journal of Consumer Research, 45, October 2018, pp. 553–570.

References 

Year of birth missing (living people)
Living people
Romanian emigrants to Canada
Canadian sociologists
Canadian women sociologists
21st-century Canadian women scientists
21st-century social scientists
Canadian expatriates in Germany
Scientists from Toronto
Academic staff of York University